Tanner Gregory Purdum (born August 15, 1984) is a former American football long snapper who played seven seasons with the New York Jets of the National Football League (NFL). Purdum comes from Ava, Missouri. He was signed by the Kansas City Chiefs as an undrafted free agent in 2009. He played college football at Baker.

Professional career

Kansas City Chiefs
On April 7, 2009, the Kansas City Chiefs signed Purdum with the intention of having him compete for the starting job of long snapper. On August 13, 2009, the Chiefs waived Purdum in favor of Thomas Gafford.

New York Jets
On February 5, 2010, the New York Jets signed Purdum to a three-year contract after incumbent long snapper James Dearth, who was an unrestricted free agent at the time, had a few snaps that were "off the mark" in the 2009 season. Purdum was recommended to the team by former Chiefs and Jets punter Louie Aguiar.

On March 10, 2017, Purdum signed a one-year contract extension with the Jets.

On September 2, 2017, Purdum was released by the Jets after the team traded for rookie long snapper Thomas Hennessy. At the time, Purdum was the longest-tenured player on the team, and the last remaining player on the roster who had appeared in a playoff game for the Jets.

On March 28, 2018, Purdum announced his retirement from the NFL.

Personal life
Purdum is married to his wife, Kara. He received his master's degree in education from Baker in 2009. Purdum graduated from Ava High School in Ava, Missouri in 2003.

References

External links
New York Jets Bio

1984 births
Living people
Sportspeople from Enid, Oklahoma
People from McLennan County, Texas
Players of American football from Texas
American football quarterbacks
American football long snappers
Baker Wildcats football players
Kansas City Chiefs players
New York Jets players
People from Ava, Missouri